Chehel Zari may refer to:
 Chehel Zari-ye Ajam, Bushehr Province
 Chehel Zari-ye Arab, Bushehr Province
 Chehel Zari, Ilam